Rauhia is a genus of Peruvian plants in the Amaryllis family.

Species
Rauhia decora Ravenna - Perú (Amazonas)
Rauhia multiflora (Kunth) Ravenna - Perú (Cajamarca)
Rauhia occidentalis Ravenna - Perú (Cajamarca)
Rauhia sagasteguiana Ravenna - Perú (Cajamarca)
Rauhia staminosa Ravenna - Perú (Amazonas)

References

Amaryllidaceae genera
Endemic flora of Peru